The Emperor is a short film by George Lucas about the radio DJ Bob Hudson (known as "The Emperor"), made while Lucas was a film student at the University of Southern California's film school.

The film was made in 1967 when Lucas returned to USC as a graduate student. A 20-minute documentary, the film was made in 10 weeks.

See also
List of American films of 1967

References

External links 
 

Short films directed by George Lucas
American student films
1967 films
American short films
1960s English-language films